Corporate statism, state corporatism, or simply corporatism is a political culture and a form of corporatism whose adherents hold that the corporate group, which forms the basis of society, is the state. The state requires all members of a particular economic sector to join an officially designated interest group. Such interest groups thus attain public status, and they participate in national policymaking. As a result, the state has great control over the groups, and groups have great control over their members.

As with other political cultures, societies have existed historically which exemplified corporate statism, for instance as propounded by Othmar Spann (1878-1950) in Austria and implemented by Benito Mussolini (1883-1945) in Italy (1922-1943), António de Oliveira Salazar's Estado Novo in Portugal (1933-1974) and by the Federal State of Austria. After World War II, corporate statism went on to influence the rapid development of South Korea and Japan. 

Corporate statism most commonly manifests itself as a ruling party acting as a mediator between the workers, capitalists and other prominent state interests by institutionally incorporating them into the ruling mechanism. Corporatist systems were most prevalent in the mid-20th century in Europe and later elsewhere in developing countries. According to this critique, interests, both social and economic, are so diverse that a state cannot possibly mediate between them effectively through incorporating them. Social conflicts go beyond incorporated dichotomies of labor and capital to include innumerable groups. Furthermore, globalization presents challenges, both social and economic, that corporate states are said to be incapable of addressing because these problems transcend state borders and approaches. Corporate statism therefore differs from corporate nationalism in that it is a social mode of organization rather than economic nationalism operating through private business corporations. However, the tariff rate of corporate states like Austria and post-war South Korea were low. This would call into question the incompatibility of economic globalism with corporate statism.

Corporate statism remains very controversial in many countries, including South Korea, Japan, and Portugal, and providing denotation for the term has proved incredibly difficult.

See also
Chaebol — a type of very large South Korean business conglomerate
Miracle on the Han River - An economic transformation in South Korea
Kabushiki gaisha — A Japanese company
''Corporatism - ideology which corporate statism is a subset of
Corporatocracy — a government dominated by business interests, often mistaken for corporatism
Fascism — a political ideology that sometimes includes corporate statism as a component
State capitalism — an economic form in which state-controlled enterprises dominate the economy and operate for-profit

References

Corporatism
Political science terminology
Statism
Totalitarianism

ja:コーポラティズム